Liga Deportiva Universitaria de Quito's 1984 season was the club's 54th year of existence, the 31st year in professional football and the 24th in the top level of professional football in Ecuador.

Kits
Supplier: AdidasSponsor(s): Banco Popular

Competitions

Serie A

First stage

Group 1

Note: Intergroups match (LDU Quito - El Nacional)

Results

Second stage

Note: Intergroups match (LDU Quito - El Nacional)

Results

Liguilla Final

Results

References
RSSSF - 1984 Serie A

External links
Official Site 

1984